Mark Jake Johnson Weinberger (born May 28, 1978) is an American actor, comedian, film producer and screenwriter best known for his role as Nick Miller in the Fox sitcom New Girl (2011–2018), for which he was nominated for the Critics' Choice Television Award for Best Actor in a Comedy Series in 2018, and as Spider-Man in the Oscar-winning animated film Spider-Man: Into the Spider-Verse (2018), a role he will reprise in its sequel (2023). He also starred in Let's Be Cops (2014), and appeared in Paper Heart (2009), Get Him to the Greek (2010), Safety Not Guaranteed (2012), 21 Jump Street (2012), Drinking Buddies (2013), Jurassic World (2015), The Mummy (2017), and Tag (2018). He co-starred as Greyson "Grey" McConnell in the ABC drama series Stumptown (2019–2020).

Early life
Johnson was born in Evanston, Illinois, a northern suburb of Chicago, to Ken Weinberger, who owned a car dealership, and Eve Johnson, an artist who made stained glass windows. He was named after his maternal uncle, Mark Johnson, who died at the age of 26 in a motorcycle accident in 1977, a year before Jake was born. Johnson attended New Trier High School in Winnetka. His parents divorced when he was two, and he and his older siblings, brother Dan and sister Rachel, were raised by his single mother. Johnson then took his mother's last name during high school. He has stated that when he was 17, his father resurfaced and now they are close.

Career
Johnson grew up a fan of the Second City improv troupe. Raised in Wilmette, he graduated from New Trier High School in Winnetka and started his post-secondary education at the University of Iowa. While in Iowa City, he wrote a play, which wound up earning him admission to the Dramatic Writing Department at NYU's Tisch School of the Arts, followed by the 2002 John Golden Playwriting Prize and the Sloan Fellowship for Screenwriting. The New York City off-Broadway group The Ensemble Studio Theater produced his play Cousins.

While in New York, Johnson started a sketch comedy troupe The Midwesterners, modeling their material and style after HBO's sketch comedy Mr. Show with Bob and David. After moving to Los Angeles, Johnson supported himself as a waiter and a production assistant, also scoring a series of bit feature and guest TV roles. In 2007, he landed a more regular gig with the TBS mini-show Derek and Simon: The Show, produced by Bob Odenkirk.

In 2009, he appeared in the mockumentary Paper Heart. In 2010, Johnson was cast in a small role in the Russell Brand comedy, Get Him to the Greek. He played Uma Thurman's character's brother in the romantic comedy Ceremony, and as a buddy of Ashton Kutcher's character in No Strings Attached. In 2011, he played Jesus in A Very Harold & Kumar 3D Christmas. In 2012, he appeared in the film version of 21 Jump Street, which starred Jonah Hill and Channing Tatum. Johnson made an appearance at the 2012 Sundance Festival as one of the leads in Safety Not Guaranteed.

From 2011 to 2018, Johnson starred as Nick Miller alongside Zooey Deschanel on New Girl. In 2013, he appeared in the music video for "Rouse Yourself", a song by indie-soul band JC Brooks & the Uptown Sound alongside his Safety Not Guaranteed co-star Aubrey Plaza. He also starred (as a fictional version of himself) in a series of Dodge Dart commercials with Craig Robinson. In 2015, he played park informatician Lowery Cruthers in Jurassic World. In 2017, Johnson starred as Eddie Garrett in the Netflix comedy film Win It All.

The web series Drunk History was inspired by a 2007 conversation that Johnson had with series creator Derek Waters. Johnson, while drunk, was trying to describe the story of Otis Redding's death to Waters, and Waters was inspired to build a series around history narrated by drunk people. Johnson later appeared in the first episode of the web series as Aaron Burr. After it was adapted for television under the same title on Comedy Central, he appeared in the eighth episode as William B. Travis, and the ninth episode of season three as Boris Spassky.

In 2018, Johnson appeared in the comedy film Tag as Randy Cilliano. In the same year, it was announced that Johnson was cast in the lead role of Ben Hopkins in the Netflix adult animation series Hoops. Also that year, Johnson provided the voice of Peter B. Parker / Spider-Man in Spider-Man: Into the Spider-Verse.

In 2019, Johnson was cast in the lead role of Grey McConnell in the ABC drama series Stumptown. He took over the role from Mark Webber, who played the character in the original pilot episode.

Personal life
Johnson married artist Erin Payne in 2006 and has twin daughters Elizabeth and Olivia, born in 2014. Johnson and Payne have been together since 2003.

Filmography

Film

Television

Video games

Music videos

Playwright

References

External links

 
 

1978 births
American male comedians
21st-century American comedians
American male film actors
American male television actors
American male video game actors
American male voice actors
American people of English descent
American people of Irish descent
American people of Jewish descent
American people of Polish descent
Living people
Male actors from Evanston, Illinois
Tisch School of the Arts alumni
University of Iowa alumni
21st-century American male actors
New Trier High School alumni
Upright Citizens Brigade Theater performers